This is a list of recording artists who have reached number one on the singles chart in Finland since January 1996.

All acts are listed alphabetically.
Solo artists are alphabetized by last name (unless they use only their first name, e.g. Akon, listed under A), Groups by group name excluding "A," "An" and "The."
Featured artists that have been given credit on the record are included

0-9

6ix9ine (1)
21 Savage (1)
 51Kookia (1)
The 69 Eyes (3)

A

 A36 (1)
Jonne Aaron (1)
Anna Abreu (3)
Adele (3)
Christina Aguilera (1)
Aikakone (1)
Ismo Alanko (1)
Dr. Alban (1)
Amorphis (3)
Nikke Ankara (6)
Anne-Marie (1)
Erin Anttila (2)
Koop Arponen (1)
Apocalyptica (1)
Apulanta (21)
Natalia Avelon (2)
 Averagekidluke (1)
Avicii (3)

B

Jannika B (1)
Babylon Zoo (1)
 Neljä Baritonia (1)
The Baseballs (1)
 Bee (1)
Before the Dawn (1)
Lou Bega (1)
Behm (4)
 Bess (1)
Justin Bieber (6)
 Big Daddy & Rockin' Combo (1)
 Mikko Björk (1)
The Black Eyed Peas (1)
Blind Channel (1)
Bloodpit (2)
Tuure Boelius (1)
 Boyat (1)
Musta Barbaari (1)
Bomfunk MC's (3)
Brädi (1)

C
 
 Max'C (1)
Cantores minores (1) 
Camila Cabello (1)
Mariah Carey (3)
Carly Rae Jepsen (1)
The Chainsmokers (1)
Charon (1)
Cheek (18)
Children of Bodom (7)
Chisu (3)
Adam Clayton (1)
Clean Bandit (3)
Cledos (4)
 Cliché (2)
CMX (7)
Coolio (1)
 Costi (1)
Miley Cyrus (1)

D

Gigi D'Agostino (1)
Dallas Superstars (1)
Darude (4)
DCUP (1)
Deep Insight (1)
Diandra (1)
Diablo (1)
Celine Dion (1)
DJ Snake (2)
 DJ Urho (1)
Don Johnson Big Band (1)
Duck Sauce (1)
Dynoro (1)

E

Samuli Edelmann (1)
Eiffel 65 (1)
Billie Eilish (1)
Isac Elliot (4)
Elastinen (8)
 Ellinoora (1)
Elonkerjuu (3)
Emila (1)
Eminem (5)
Ensiferum (1)
Eppu Normaali (1)
 Etta (1)
E-Type (1)
Evelina (3)

F

Faithless (1)
Fedde Le Grande (1)
Feiled (1)
Fintelligens (3)
Flo Rida (1)
Luis Fonsi (1)
The Fugees (1)

G

Pikku G (1)
Mikael Gabriel (7)
Lady Gaga (4)
Gayle (1)
Gettomasa (5)
 The Giant Leap (1)
Gimmel (2)
Jess Glynne (1)
GoodWill & MGI (1)
 Elias Gould (1)
Ellie Goulding (2)
Gotye (1)
Ariana Grande (2)
David Guetta (4)

H

 Olli Halonen (1)
 Hannibal & Soppa (1)
Hanoi Rocks (2)
Calvin Harris (4)
 Adi L Hasla (1)
Haloo Helsinki! (4)
Sami Hedberg (1)
Hevisaurus (1)
HIM (7)
Tea Hiilloste (1)
Don Huonot (3)

I

 I.B.E. (1)
Ilari Sahamies (1)
Enrique Iglesias (1)
Iron Maiden (3)

J

 Jambo (1)
 Jane (1)
Järjestyshäiriö (1)
Vika Jigulina (1)
Jippu (1)
Elton John (1)
 Joulumantelit (1)
 Judge Bone's Original Monstervision Freakshow (1)
 @Junkmail (1)
JVG (19)

K

Käärijä (1)
Kasmir (1)
Tuomas Kauhanen (1)
Kaija Koo (1)
Aksel Kankaanranta (1)
Anssi Kela (1)
Kent (1)
Kesha (1)
Alicia Keys (1)
The Kid Laroi (2)
Kimbra (1)
Kinetik Control (1)
Kings of Leon (1)
Kiuas (1)
Wiz Khalifa (1)
Klamydia (3)
 Kometfabriken (1)
Kotiteollisuus (7)
Kotipelto (1)
 Kuolleet Intiaanit (1)
Kube (1) 
Kuumaa (1)
Kwan (3)
 Kymppilinja (1)

L

Las Ketchup (1)
Ryan Lewis (1)
 Lucas Leon (1)
Lil Nas X (1)
Lil Peep (1)
Lil Pump (1)
Lilly Wood and the Prick (1)
Arttu Lindeman (4)
Jennifer Lopez (3)
Lord Est (3)
Loreen (1)
Lordi (5)
Los Del Rio (1)
Demi Lovato (1)
Lovex (1)
 Lucas (1)

M

M.I.A. (1)
MØ (2)
Macklemore (1)
Madonna (7)
Major Lazer (2)
Post Malone (2)
Mannhai (1)
Måneskin (2)
Mariska (1)
Matti ja Teppo (1)
Sam Martin (2)
Maroon 5 (1)
Jarkko Martikainen (1)
 Nelli Matula (1)
Ava Max (1)
Edward Maya (1)
Shawn Mendes (1)
Antero Mertaranta (2)
Metallica (11)
Lena Meyer-Landrut (1)
George Michael (1)
Robert Miles (1)
Nicki Minaj (1)
 Mish Mash (1)
 Mokama (2)
Larry Mullen Jr. (1)

N

Laura Närhi (1)
Negative (6)
 Nemo (1)
John Newman (1)
Nightwish (14)
 Ninja (1)
Reino Nordin (1)
Norther (1)
 Mr. Nordic Bet (1)
Petri Nygård (4)
Nylon Beat (1)

O

Oasis (1)
The Offspring (1)
OneRepublic (1)
Orkidea (1)
Mr. Oizo (1)
 Oliver (1)

P

Robin Packalen (1)
Pain Confessor (1)
Hanna Pakarinen (1)
Paradisio (1)
Sean Paul (1)
Pete Parkkonen (1)
Paperi T (1)
Passenger (1)
 Passionworks (1)
 Pehmoaino (1)
Katy Perry (1)
 Peter (1)
 Peewee (1)
Peer Günt (1)
 Pihlaja (1)
Pink (1)
Pitbull (2)
 Pizza Enrico (1)
Jukka Poika (3)
 Poju (1)
 Portion Boys (1)
PMMP (2)
 Profeetat (2)
Eric Prydz (1)
The Prodigy (6)
Psy (1)
The Pussycat Dolls (1)
Charlie Puth (1)
Anna Puu (1)
Pyhimys (4)

R

A. R. Rahman (1)
 Ramses II (1)
Rammstein (2)
Mari Rantasila (1)
Raappana (1)
Raptori (1)
The Rasmus (5)
Timo Rautiainen (1)
Redrama (2)
Reverend Bizarre (1)
Bebe Rexha (1)
Rihanna (4)
LeAnn Rimes (1)
Ripsipiirakka (1)
Robin (3)
Roope Salminen & Koirat (2)
Run-DMC (2)
Alexander Rybak (1)

S

Sini Sabotage (1)
Sami Saari (1)
Sanni (6)
Robin Schulz (1)
Scooter (2)
The Scourger (1)
Sentenced (1)
 Sexmane (1)
Shakira (2)
Ed Sheeran (3)
Showtek (1)
Sia (1)
Eva Simons (1)
 Sinking (1)
Mikko Sipola (1)
 Smak (1)
Sonata Arctica (4)
 De Souza (1)
Spekti (1)
 Stamn1na (1)
 Hank Solo (1)
Britney Spears (5)
Spice Girls (2)
Stig (1)
 Sturm und Drang (1)
Suburban Tribe (1)
Suede (1)
Shèna (1)
Swallow the Sun (1)

T

 Marita Taavitsainen (1)
Lauri Tähkä (1)
Tasis (1)
Teflon Brothers (3)
Tehosekoitin (4)
Justin Timberlake (1)
Timbaland (1)
Timo Rautiainen & Trio Niskalaukaus (4)
 Tippa (1)
Teräsbetoni (1)
Tarot (1)
Tones and I (1)
 Turisti (1)
Antti Tuisku (11)
Martin Tungevaag (1)
Tungevaag & Raaban (1)
Tarja Turunen (2)
 Aki Tykki (1)
 Tyrävyö (2)
 A-Tyypp (1)

U

U2 (2)

V

Martti Vainaa & Sallitut aineet (1)
Valvomo (1)
Jenni Vartiainen (3)
Vassy (1)
 Ves Rain (1)
Paula Vesala (1)
Viikate (6)
Maija Vilkkumaa (1)
Ville Valo (3)
 Villegalle (1)
L.V. (1)
 Viivi (1)

W

Waldo's People (2)
Alan Walker (2)
Wanz (1)
The Weeknd (1)
Kanye West (1)
Jack White (1)
 White Flame (2)
 Charlie Who? (1)
Widescreen Mode (2)
will.i.am (2)
 William (1)
Juice Wrld (1)

X

 XL5 (1)
 X-Prophets (1)
XXXTentacion (1)

Y

Daddy Yankee (1)
 Yb026 (1)
Lauri Ylönen (1)
Yö (5)
Yolanda Be Cool (1)
YUP (1)

Z

Zen Café (1)

See also 

The Official Finnish Charts
Luettelot Suomen albumilistan ykkösistä vuosittain (1966–1988)  
 Luettelot Suomen virallisen albumilistan ykkösistä vuosittain (1989→) 
 Luettelot Suomen virallisen singlelistan ykkösistä (1951→)

References

External links
The Official Finnish Charts on IFPI Finland's website
Archives of Finnish Charts including singles and albums mid-1995 to present 
Archives of Finnish Singles Chart

Finnish music